The Massachusetts Interscholastic Athletic Association (MIAA) is an organization that sponsors activities in thirty-three sports, comprising 374 public and private high schools in the U.S. state of Massachusetts.  The MIAA is a member of the National Federation of State High School Associations (NFHS), which writes the rules for most U.S. high school sports and activities. The MIAA was founded in 1978, and was preceded by both the Massachusetts Secondary School Principals Association (MSSPA) (1942–1978) and the Massachusetts Interscholastic Athletic Council (MIAC) (1950–1978).

Sports

Men's team sports

 Baseball
 Basketball
 Field Hockey 
 Football
 Golf
 Gymnastics
 Ice Hockey
 Lacrosse
 Rugby 
 Ski
 Soccer
 Softball
 Swimming & Diving
 Tennis
 Track & Cross Country
 Volleyball
 Wrestling

Girls wrestling gained MIAA status in 2011.
Rugby became the MIAA's 35th sport in 2016, following a 2015 MIAC vote that passed by a wide majority.

Districts & Leagues
The leagues in the MIAA are separated into nine districts (Numbered 1-9).

District 1 
Berkshire County League
Pioneer Valley Interscholastic Athletic Conference (PVIAC)

District 2 
Central Massachusetts Conference (CMC)
Colonial Athletic Conference (CAC)
Dual Valley Conference (DVC)
Inter High League (IHL)
South Worcester County League (SWCL)

District 3 
Midland Wachusett League (MWL)
Worcester County Athletic Conference (WCAC)

District 4 
Dual County League (DCL)
Merrimack Valley Conference (MVC)
Middlesex League (ML)

District 5 
Cape Ann League (CAL)
Commonwealth Athletic Conference (CAC)
Greater Boston League (GBL)
Northeastern Conference (NEC)

District 6 
Boston City League (BCL)
Catholic Central League (CCL)
Catholic Conference

District 7 
Bay State Conference (BSC)
Hockomock League
Tri-Valley League (TVL)

District 8 
Mayflower Athletic Conference (MAC)
South Coast Conference (SCC)
Southeast Conference (SEC)

District 9 
Cape and Islands League (CAL)
Patriot League (PL)
South Shore League (SSL)

State Champions

Baseball 
The MIAA Baseball State Champions are listed below.

Most State Championships

Basketball 
The state champions for basketball are listed below.

Football

Ice hockey 
The state champions for ice hockey are listed below.

Boys' ice hockey

Most State Championships

Soccer

Boys Soccer 

The MIAA Boys Soccer State Champions are listed below.

Girls Soccer 

The MIAA Girls Soccer State Champions are listed below.

See also
 Massachusetts Charter School Athletic Organization
 MIAA Division 1A baseball tournament
 MIAA Division 1A Boy's Ice Hockey Tournament
 New England Preparatory School Athletic Council

References

External links 
 

1978 establishments in Massachusetts
1978 in sports in Massachusetts
High school sports associations in the United States
 
Massachusetts high school sports associations
Sports in Norfolk County, Massachusetts 
Sports organizations established in 1978